The 2014–15 Portland Pilots women's basketball team will represent the University of Portland in the 2014–15 college basketball season. It was head coach Cheryl Sorensen's first season as head coach at Portland. The Pilots were members of the West Coast Conference and play their home games at the Chiles Center. They finished the season 4–26, 2–16 in WCC play to finish in last place. They lost in the first round of the WCC women's tournament to Santa Clara.

2014–15 Roster

Schedule and results

|-
!colspan=9 style="background:#461D7C; color:#FFFFFF;"| Exhibition

|-
!colspan=9 style="background:#461D7C; color:#FFFFFF;"| Regular Season

|-
!colspan=9 style="background:#461D7C;"| 2015 WCC Tournament

Rankings

See also
2014–15 Portland Pilots men's basketball team
Portland Pilots women's basketball

References

Portland
Portland Pilots women's basketball seasons
Portland Pilots women's basketball
Portland Pilots women's basketball